Waqullani (Aymara waqulla, pitcher, jug, -ni a suffix to indicate ownership, "the one with a jug", Hispanicized spellings Huacullane, Huacullani) may refer to:

 Waqullani, a mountain in the Arequipa Region in Peru
 Huacullani, a town in the La Paz Department in Bolivia
 Huacullani District, a district in the Puno Region in Peru